The 2016 Jackson State Tigers football team  represented Jackson State University in the 2016 NCAA Division I FCS football season. The Tigers were led by first-year head coach Tony Hughes. They played their home games at Mississippi Veterans Memorial Stadium. They were a member of the East Division of the Southwestern Athletic Conference. They finished the season 3–8 overall and 3–6 in SWAC play to tie for third place in the East Division.

Schedule

References

Jackson State
Jackson State Tigers football seasons
Jackson State Tigers football